Ronan David Jerônimo (born 22 April 1995), or simply Ronan, is a Brazilian professional footballer who plays for Seoul E-Land FC.

Career
Born in Piraúba, in the Minas Gerais state, Ronan was discovered by former professional footballer Filipe Alvim to 11 years old, being taken to the Fluminense's academy, where he remained until 2012. This year, he was loaned to Parma, but trading for its outright purchase failed and he returned from Italy after six months in the club.

In September 2013, Ronan was again loaned, this time going to the Grêmio until January 2015. He joined the under-19s team of the club's academy. In August 2014, Ronan made his debut for the first team squad of Grêmio, entering in the final minutes of 2–0 home won against Criciúma in the Campeonato Brasileiro Série A.

On 14th January 2023, Ronan joined Seoul E-Land FC of South Korean K League 2.

Career statistics

References

External links
 Ronan profile. Portal Oficial do Grêmio.
 
 
 

1995 births
Living people
Brazilian footballers
Association football forwards
Campeonato Brasileiro Série A players
K League 2 players
Grêmio Foot-Ball Porto Alegrense players
Primeira Liga players
A.D. Sanjoanense players
Rio Ave F.C. players
Varzim S.C. players
C.D. Tondela players
Seoul E-Land FC players
Brazilian expatriate footballers
Expatriate footballers in Portugal
Brazilian expatriate sportspeople in Portugal
Expatriate footballers in South Korea
Brazilian expatriate sportspeople in South Korea
Sportspeople from Minas Gerais